Atanasio Monserrate, also known as Babush, is an Indian politician from the state of Goa. Babush is a three term member of the Goa Legislative Assembly. He is a member of the Goa Legislative Assembly from Panaji. He was the Member of Legislative Assembly for Taleigao. He is married to Jennifer Monserrate, Member of Legislative Assembly, Taleigao.

He was one of the ten members of Indian National Congress who joined Bharatiya Janata Party in July 2019.

Political career
Babush contested his first election in 2002 on a United Goans Democratic Party ticket from the Taleigao Vidhan Sabha constituency. His opponent was two-term sitting member of the Assembly Somnath Datta Zuwarkar from the Indian National Congress. Monserrate defeated Zuwarkar by about two thousand votes and was elected for the very first time to the Goa assembly.

Babush was made a Minister of Town and Country Planning in the Manohar Parrikar led Government. In 2005, he and two other ministers resigned from the Manohar Parrikar led Government leaving it in a minority and thus bringing down the Bharatiya Janata Party Government of Goa.

In the coming by-election, Babush switched sides and fought the election on an Indian National Congress ticket and won the election by defeating Silveira Agnelo Mariano of the Bharatiya Janata Party by about four thousand votes. He was made a minister in the Congress government under Chief Minister Pratapsingh Rane. In the 2007 assembly elections, Monserrate was pitted against Silveira Agnelo Marian of the Bharatiya Janata Party.

Babush won that election by about two thousand votes and was appointed the Education minister of the state under Chief Minister Digambar Kamat. In the 2012, assembly election he vacated his safe seat of Taleigao for his wife Jennifer Monserrate and contested from the Santa Cruz constituency. Monserrate won that election on a Congress ticket defeating Rodolfo Louis Fernandes by about two thousand three hundred votes.

In that same election, Monserrate's wife Jennifer Monserrate also won her election from the Taleigao Vidhan Sabha constituency thus making history of sorts by having a wife and husband to be elected to the Goa Assembly. He was expelled from the Indian National Congress in 2015 for six years for "anti-party activities".

Monserrate contested the 2017 election from the Panaji (Vidhan Sabha constituency) and lost to Sidharth Sripad Kuncalienker of the Bharatiya Janata Party by about a thousand votes.

In July 2017 Monserrate joined the Goa Forward Party.

Rape Allegations
In May 2016, Goa police arrested Monserrate for rape of a minor.

References

Living people
State cabinet ministers of Goa
Goa MLAs 2022–2027
Indian prisoners and detainees
Crime in Goa
Year of birth missing (living people)
People from North Goa district
Bharatiya Janata Party politicians from Goa
Goa Forward Party politicians
United Goans Party politicians
Goa MLAs 2002–2007
Goa MLAs 2007–2012
Goa MLAs 2012–2017
Former members of Indian National Congress from Goa